Charles Samuel McDowell Jr. (October 17, 1871 – May 22, 1943) was the 10th Lieutenant Governor of Alabama from 1923 to 1927, and was the interim Governor of Alabama between July 10 and July 11, 1924, when Governor William W. Brandon was out-of-state for 21 days. The state constitution requires that, if the governor is out of the state for 20 days, that the lieutenant governor acts as governor until he returns.

McDowell was born in Eufaula, Alabama.  He graduated from the University of Alabama and opened a law practice in Eufaula in 1897.  He served as Mayor of Eufaula from 1908 to 1912, and was President of the Alabama State Bar in 1915–16.  He was elected to the Alabama State Senate in 1918.

External links
 Alabama Department of Archives and History biography

Democratic Party governors of Alabama
Lieutenant Governors of Alabama
Democratic Party Alabama state senators
Mayors of places in Alabama
University of Alabama alumni
1871 births
1943 deaths
People from Eufaula, Alabama